Palermo is an unincorporated community in Lincoln County, West Virginia, United States. Palermo had a post office, which closed on February 1, 1997.

The community was named after Palermo, Sicily.

References

Unincorporated communities in Lincoln County, West Virginia
Unincorporated communities in West Virginia